Keratin 80, also known as KRT80, is a protein which humans is encoded by the KRT80  gene.

Function
Keratins, such as KRT80, are filament proteins that make up one of the major structural fibers of epithelial cells.

References

Further reading